Gaylord is a name of Norman French origin, from the Old French gaillard meaning "joyful" or "high-spirited". It may refer to:

People
Gaylord (given name)

Surname
Bill Gaylord (born 1967), British former alpine skier
Charles Gaylord (1936–2009), American martial artist
Chester Gaylord (1899–1984), vocalist
Edith Kinney Gaylord (1916–2001), journalist
Edward Gaylord (Edward L. Gaylord, 1919–2003), owner of The Oklahoman and founder of the Gaylord Entertainment Company
Edward K. Gaylord (1873–1974), founder of newspaper The Oklahoman
Frank Gaylord (1925–2018), American sculptor
Glenn Gaylord, American film and television director, producer, and screenwriter
Harvey Gaylord (1904–1983), President of Bell Aerospace
James M. Gaylord (1811–1874), U.S. Representative from Ohio
Jeff Gaylord (born 1958), American professional wrestler
Jim Gaylord (born 1974), American artist
John Gaylord (1797–1874), early Mormon leader
Joseph Gaylord, political consultant
Karen X. Gaylord (1921–2014), American actress and Miss Minnesota
Levi B. Gaylord (1840–1900), American soldier who fought in the American Civil War
Mitch Gaylord (born 1961), American gymnast
Norman Gaylord (1923–2007), American industrial chemist and research scientist
Reuben Gaylord (1812–1880), recognized leader of the missionary pioneers in the Nebraska Territory
Ronnie Gaylord (1930–2004), solo singer and member of The Gaylords
Scott Gaylord (born 1958), American NASCAR driver
Winfield R. Gaylord (1870–1943), member of the Wisconsin State Senate

Arts and media

Characters
Gaylord Buzzard, a character in the cartoon strip Broom-Hilda
Gaylord the Camel, the mascot of the Campbell Fighting Camels and Lady Camels
Gaylord Focker, a character in the movie Meet the Parents and its sequels
Gaylord Justice, a character in the movie Smokey and the Bandit II
Gaylord Ravenal, a character in Edna Ferber's novel Show Boat, and the musical play and movies based on it
Frederick Gaylord Crane, a character in the television series Frasier
Gaylord Robinson, a character in the animated series The Amazing World of Gumball
Gaylord, a character portrayed by English comic Dick Emery

Music
Dean Ford and the Gaylords, a 1960s Scottish beat group later known as The Marmalade
The Gaylords (Dominican band), a popular Carnival band from 1966 to 1974
The Gaylords (American vocal group), an American singing trio
Gaylord (band) from late 1990s-2010

Businesses
Gaylord Hotels, a large convention hotel brand of Marriott International
Gaylord (automobile), a former car manufacturing company
Gaylord Container Corporation, a former U.S. paper manufacturer
Gaylord (container), a genericized term for a bulk box, with a pallet for the base, and corrugated cardboard for the walls
Gaylord Chemical Corporation, located in the New Orleans suburb of Slidell, Louisiana, USA
Gaylord Entertainment Company

Places
Gaylord, Kansas
Gaylord, Michigan
Gaylord, Minnesota
Gaylord, Oregon
Gaylord, Virginia
Gaylordsville, Connecticut
Gaylord Entertainment Center, former name of Bridgestone Arena
Gaylord Family Oklahoma Memorial Stadium, at the University of Oklahoma

Other uses
The Chicago Gaylords, a street gang
Sir Gaylord, an American Thoroughbred racehorse who later became a successful sire

See also
Gailard Sartain (born 1946), American actor and comic
Gaillard (disambiguation)
Galliard (disambiguation)
Gayelord Hauser (1895–1984), German-born nutritionist